Jack Weinstock (died 23 May 1969 in New York City, New York) was an American author and playwright who is best known for writing the musical book for How to Succeed in Business Without Really Trying. He also co-authored the play Catch Me If You Can with Willie Gilbert and wrote the book for the musical Hot Spot.

References

External links
 
 

Year of birth missing
1969 deaths
American male screenwriters
Tony Award winners
American male dramatists and playwrights
American dramatists and playwrights
Screenwriters from New York (state)
20th-century American male writers
20th-century American screenwriters